Ampittia kilombero is a species of butterfly in the family Hesperiidae. It is found in the Kilombero Valley, Tanzania.

References

Insects described in 2012
Ampittia